Tamás Nagy (born 6 June 1976) is a Hungarian football player who currently plays for Rákospalotai EAC.

References 

1976 births
Living people
Hungarian footballers
Dunaújváros FC players
Győri ETO FC players
Association football forwards
Nemzeti Bajnokság II players
Hungary international footballers